Hydroxychavicol is a phenylpropanoid compound present in leaves of Piper betle. It is a more potent inhibitor of xanthine oxidase (IC50=16.7 µM) than allopurinol.

Research  
It might be a useful new compound in treating cutaneous fungal infections. It is a promising agent in prevention and treatment of dental disorders as it had bactericidal and fungicidal effect on Streptococcus intermedius, Streptococcus mutans, and Candida albicans and inhibited biofilm formation.

See also 
 Chavicol

References 

Catechols
Phenylpropenes